The 2018 Russian Athletics Championships was held July 19-22 at Central Stadium in Kazan. The capital of Tatarstan hosted the event for the third time, having done so previously in 2008 and 2014. Around 1000 athletes from 76 regions of the country participated in the competition. Over the course of four days, 38 events were contested.

For the third year in a row, the national championships did not include the selection of an international team (on this occasion, for the 2018 European Athletics Championships). This was due to the continuation Russia's ban from international athletics by the IAAF due to doping, which began in 2015. Three Russians, who competed at that competition as Authorised Neutral Athletes (Sergey Shubenkov, Anzhelika Sidorova and Danil Lysenko), chose not to compete at the national event, instead competing at the Herculis 2018 IAAF Diamond League meeting.

Vladimir Nikitin won the men's 1500 metres in a championship record of 3:35.85. After the collapse of the USSR, only two people showed faster results at this distance: the country's record holder Vyacheslav Shabunin and Andrei Loginov. Aleksandr Lesnoy improved his personal record to 21.58 m, bringing him to fourth among Russia's all-time men's shot putters.

The 2012 Olympic champion Anna Chicherova returned from her doping ban but was beaten into second place by world-leader Mariya Lasitskene.

Ekaterina Ivonina set a European-leading time of 9:16.68 to win the 3000 metres steeplechase. She led from start to finish and beat the silver medalist by 22 seconds.

Several athletes extended their list of national honours: Dmitry Tarabin won the javelin for the sixth time in a row, while hurdler Konstantin Shabanov became a six-time champion in the 110 metres hurdles.

Championships
During 2018, Russian championships were held in various cities in individual athletics disciplines:

 31 March — Russian Championships in mountain running (uphill) (Zheleznovodsk)
 28 April — Russian Championships in cross country running (spring) (Zhukovskiy)
 30 April — Russian Championships in marathon (Volgograd)
 6 May — Russian Championships in mountain running (uphill-downhill) (Rybinsk)
 12—13 May — Russian Championships in 24-hour run (Moscow)
 30—31 May — Russian Championships in relay (Smolensk)
 9—10 June — Russian Championships in racewalking (Cheboksary)
 30 June — Russian Championships in 10,000 metres (Zhukovskiy)
 4—5July — Russian Championships in combined track and field events (Smolensk)
 2 September — Russian Championships in half marathon (Yaroslavl)
 9 September — Russian Championships in 15K run (Saransk)
 9 September — Russian Championships in 100 kilometres (Saint Petersburg)
 20—21 October — Russian Championships in cross country running (autumn) (Orenburg)
 28 October — Russian Championships in mountain running (long-distance) (Krasnaya Polyana)

Results

Men

Women 

 On October 25, 2018, the All-Russian Federation of Athletics announced a 4-year disqualification of the hammer thrower Natalia Polyakova for 4 years. Methenolone was detected in her doping test at this event. The result of the athlete in this tournament (3rd place, 66.54 m) was annulled in accordance with the rules.

Mountain running (uphill)
The 19th Russian Mountain Running Championship (uphill) took place on March 31, 2018 in Zheleznovodsk, Stavropol Territory. The race circuit was on the slopes of Mount Beshtau. A total of 82 participants (51 men and 31 women) from 25 regions of Russia started the race. Alexey Pagnuev repeated last year's success, winning the men's race. Since 2011, for the sixth time, Alexei was in the top three of the country's uphill mountain running championship. Galina Egorova became the national champion of Russia for the seventh time in her career. She won previous victories in the indoor 5000 metres (2007), mountain (up and down) (2010, 2011, 2017) and the uphill mountain race (2012, 2013). For the third year in a row, Anastasia Rudnaya, the world champion in orienteering, climbed the podium in the women's event. After two bronze medals, she won the silver medal, only 16 seconds behind the winner.

Men

Women

Cross country (spring)
The 2018 Russian Spring Cross Country Championships were held on 28 April in Zhukovskiy, Moscow Oblast. A total of 73 runners (34 men and 39 women) from 33 regions of Russia took part in four senior races.

Men

Women

Marathon
The 2018 Russian Marathon Championships was held on 30 April in Volgograd, incorporated into the city's annual marathon.

Men

Women

Mountain running (uphill-downhill)
The 2018 Russian Mountain Running Championships (uphill-downhill) was the 20th edition of the competition. It was held on 6 May 2018 in Rybinsk, Yaroslavl Oblast. A total of 48 runners (33 men and 15 women) from 17 regions started the championships.

Men

Women

24-hour run
The Russian 24-hour Championship was held on May 12–13 at the Iskra Stadium in Moscow as part of the XXVII Super Day marathon. A total of 55 athletes (40 men and 15 women) from 19 regions of Russia took the start. Nadezhda Gubareva became the youngest winner of the championship: at the time of the finish she was 22 years 240 days. The men's champion, Konstantin Chekulov, won the national championship for the first time in his career. A 60-year-old Yuriy Galkin, after two wins in 2016 and 2017, appeared on the podium for a third time. For the third year in a row, the silver medal in the women's race was won by Nadezhda Shikhanova, and the bronze medal by Anna Sidorova.

Men

Women

Relay
The Russian Relay Championships was held in Smolensk on May 30–31 at the stadium of the Smolensk Academy of Physical Culture. Competitions were held simultaneously with the Russian Team Athletics Championship.

Men

Women

Racewalking
The 2018 Russian Race Walking Championships was held June 9-10 in Cheboksary. The route was laid along the embankment of the Cheboksary Bay. The competition was attended by 59 athletes (33 men and 26 women) from 9 regions of the country. For the first time, a women's 50 km race took place at the Russian Championship, following the IAAF's international recognition of the event in 2016. The first champion and record holder of Russia was Klavdiya Afanasyeva. 

The 19-year-old Sergey Shirobokov claimed the men's title over 20 km: his result (1:17:25) made him the fourth fastest ever in Russia and the ninth in the world among adults. Elena Lashmanova exceeded the 20 km world record time by almost a minute, 1:23:39 versus 1:24:38. Her time was a new national record, but was not ratified by the IAAF as a global one due to the disqualification of the national federation due to the doping scandal and, as a result, the lack of international judges at the race.

Men

Women

10,000 metres
The 2018 Russian Championships in the 10,000 metres was held on June 30 as part of the Znamensky Brothers Memorial. Competitions were held at Meteor Stadium in the suburban town of Zhukovsky, Moscow Oblast. The races took place in the evening in warm and windless weather. A total of 44 athletes (29 men and 15 women) from 29 regions of the country started the championships. Elena Sedova defended the title of champion of the country, leading from the start. In the men's race, Vladimir Nikitin won his first national title.

Men

Women

Combined events
The 2018 Russian Combined Events Championships was held on July 4–5 in Smolensk. The competition was attended by 51 athletes (28 men and 23 women) from 18 regions of the country. Competitions were held at the stadium of the Smolensk Academy of Physical Culture. Artyom Makarenko and Victoria Vaseykina won the outdoor national championship for the first time in their career. Vaseykina's victory was secured by 5743 points - the lowest winning score among for the heptathlon championship since 1992.

Men

Women

Half marathon
The 2018 Russian Half Marathon Championships was held on 2 September in Yaroslavl as part of the Yaroslavl Half Marathon. The circuit was a circular 10.55 km route set in the historic part of the city. A total of 47 athletes (29 men and 18 women) from 24 regions of the country took the start.

Competitions were held in warm and sunny weather. In the women's run, Irina Sergeeva took the lead from the start. Tatyana Arkhipova overtook her on the second lap of the course and won by a margin of twelve seconds. In the men's race, the top three contenders for the medals were determined after the 15th kilometer. Artem Aplachkin, who won the Russian title for the second time in his career, was the fastest in the final segment.

Men

Women

15K
The 2018 Russian 15K Championships were held on 9 September in Saransk as part of the 46th run in the memory of Peter Bolotnikov. A total of 49 athletes (31 men and 18 women) from 12 regions of the country entered the competition. 31-year-old Ilya Zmaznev for the first time in his career became national champion. Elena Nagovitsyna won the women's race, following a fourth place finish at the half marathon championship a week earlier.

Men

Women

100 km
The 2018 Russian 100 km Championships was held on 9 September in Saint Petersburg. The competition took place on Krestovsky Island on a circular track 2.5 km long under comfortable weather conditions (cloudy, up to +20 degrees). A total of 33 athletes (21 men and 12 women) from 20 regions of the country took the start.

The main surprise of the men's race was the withdrawal of the current champion and record holder of Russia Vasily Larkin. From the start, he stepped forward along with Vsevolod Khudyakov, after the 30th kilometer he made a successful break-away attempt and at some point had an almost minute advantage. However, after the middle of the distance, the gap began to decrease: by 60 km, the leaders again caught up, and after the 75th km, Larkin stopped running altogether. After the main competitor had vanished, Khudyakov was 17 minutes ahead of the nearest pursuer, which was more than enough to maintain the first position and win the Russian championship in the 100 km run for the third time in his career.

Several favorites stopped the fight in the course of the race and in the women's race. The current champion of the country Alsou Asanova came down after 57 km, the world champion Marina Zhalybina ran a little more than 30 km. In the middle of the race, the leader was Olga Ukolova, the bronze medalist of the previous year's championship. At the beginning of the second half, she was ahead of Nadezhda Gogoleva and Dina Zakharchenko, who led the fight for the victory to the finish. At certain moments, Gogoleva's advantage reached almost two minutes, but by 85 km only 10 seconds remained. Zakharchenko closely approached the leader, but she did not have the strength for the final segment. Nadezhda Gogoleva became the champion of Russia for the second time in her career, Dina Zakharchenko won the silver medal, losing by less than a minute. For the second year in a row, Nadezhda Shikhanova reached the national podium in both supermarathon disciplines, 24 hours and 100 km.

Men

Women

Cross country (autumn)
The 2018 Russian Autumn Cross Country Championships was held in Orenburg on 20–21 October. A total of 58 runners (38 men and 20 women) from 29 regions of Russia took part in two senior races. Competitions were held in cool weather with strong gusty wind. Alexey Vikulov added the title of the strongest on the autumn highway in Orenburg to the victory in the spring national championship in cross country.

Men

Women

Mountain running (long-distance)
The 12th Russian Championship in Long Distance Mountain Running took place on 28 October in Krasnaya Polyana, Krasnodar Territory. A total of 42 participants (30 men and 12 women) from 13 regions of Russia took part. Nadezhda Leshchinskaya won the women's run for the fourth year in a row, ahead of Nailiya Yulamanova.

Men

Women

References

Results
 
 
 

Russian Athletics Championships
Russian Athletics Championships
Russian Athletics Championships
Russian Athletics Championships
Sport in Kazan
21st century in Kazan